Panda Restaurant Group, Inc., parent company of Panda Inn, Panda Express and Hibachi-San, was founded by Andrew and Peggy Tsiang Cherng  and Andrew's father, Master Chef Ming-Tsai Cherng, the family originating in the Yangzhou region of China's Jiangsu province. They started their first Panda Inn restaurant in 1973 in Pasadena, California. Ten years later a developer of the Glendale Galleria, who was a patron of Panda Inn, asked Andrew to start a fast-service version of his restaurant in the new mall. In 1985 the store went from five locations to nine in just one year.

The group has its headquarters in Rosemead, California. Panda Express in the largest Asian-American restaurant chain in the United States, with 2,200 branches. In 2019 Panda Express opened its first branch in Manila, Philippines, as a joint venture between the Panda Restaurant Group and Jollibee Foods Corp., JBPX Foods.

Andrew Cherng, age 70, and his wife Peggy Tsiang Cherng met at Baker University in Baldwin City, Kansas. Peggy Cherng went on to receive her B.S. degree in Mathematics from Oregon State University in 1971 and a Ph.D. in Electrical Engineering from the University of Missouri. The company debuted on Forbes' 2016 edition of America's Largest Private Companies

The Cherngs invest their personal wealth out of their family office, the Cherng Family Trust.

Companies
The Panda Restaurant Group includes Panda Express, Panda Inn, Raising Cane's Chicken Fingers (AK/HI only) and Hibachi-San.

Panda Express, the most popular, has over 2,000 locations as of 2018, making it the largest Chinese fast food chain in the United States.

Panda Inn, a sit-down restaurant chain, has 6 locations, all of which are in California, plus Wasabi, a Japanese concept.

Panda Group has been aggressively supporting popular Asian chains by introducing them in the American market.  Uncle Tetsu, Yakiya, Pieology and Ippudo are all concepts supported by Panda Group.

In 2018 it was ranked 143 on the Forbes list of America's Largest Private Companies.

Philanthropy
The majority of the Cherngs donations are done through Panda Cares, the giving arm of the Panda Group, and the Panda Charitable Foundation, to education, youth leadership development and health. Since 1999 Panda Cares has raised over $107 million.

In July 2017, the company pledged $10 million to the Children's Hospital Los Angeles, where the sixth floor will be renamed the Panda Express Floor.

In May 2022, The Huntington Hospital in Pasadena, California announced a $25 million gift from the Panda Charitable Family Foundation in support of enhancements to the hospital’s surgical care program.The Huntington Hospital announced they will be displaying the family's name on campus as a thank you to their commitment and continuous support of the hospital.

References

Further reading
Bernstein, Charles, 'Manchu Leads the Working Race,' Restaurants & Institutions, August 1, 1994, p. 30.
Cebrzynski, Gregg, 'Panda Express Breaks TV Ad Campaign as Test to Raise Brand Awareness,' Nation's Restaurant News, August 9, 1999, p. 11.
Farkas, David, 'Fast and Friendly,' Chain Leader, March 2000, p. 72.
Glover, Kara, 'Success on Oriental (Food) Express,' Los Angeles Business Journal, September 25, 1995, p. 21.
 Leibowitz, Ed, "The Tao of Panda Express: The Chinese food chain’s success story—how a single outlet in the Glendale Galleria grew to 1,800 locations worldwide—begins with one secret ingredient: owners who care", LA Magazine, April 20, 2015
Marchetti, Michele, and Alisson, Lucas, 'Creating Panda-monium,' Sales & Marketing Management, January 1996, p. 14.
Martin, Richard, 'Panda Express: Bullish about the Bear,' Nation's Restaurant News, May 16, 1994, p. 86.
------, 'Top Chi-Chi's, El Torito Execs Tackle Panda Push,' Nation's Restaurant News, August 7, 1995, p. 18
Walkup, Carolyn, 'Panda Express Promo Targets Takeout Business,' Nation's Restaurant News, February 28, 1994, p. 7.

External links

Official website
Panda Cares
 Hoover's Financial Data on the Panda Restaurant Group

Restaurant groups in the United States
Companies based in Los Angeles County, California
Restaurants established in 1973
1973 establishments in California
Rosemead, California
Privately held companies based in California